Cathedrals is the fourth major studio album from Tenth Avenue North. Reunion Records, a label of Provident Label Group, released the project on November 10, 2014. Tenth Avenue North worked with producer John Fields in the creation of this album.

Critical reception

Cathedrals received positive reviews from critics. Indicating in a nine out of ten review for Cross Rhythms, Matthew Cordle mentions, "In summary, a great set of songs that build on past work and delivers a strong message from one of the best bands currently working in CCM." Sarah Fine, writing in a four and a half star review for New Release Tuesday, realizes, "This is a worthy effort by an incredible band seeking to say honest things." Referencing in a three and a half star review for Jesus Freak Hideout, Roger Gelwicks explains, "Cathedrals feels unsurprising, but also genuine... It's inconsistent, but also entirely respectable, and it's this latter quality that makes for a landmark CCM release this fall." Andy Argyrakis from CCM Magazine, in a three star review, suggesting, "Musically speaking, the contemporary pop arrangements are pleasant and simple, while front man Mike Donehey’s smooth delivery is a fitting vehicle to convey encouragement and comfort to fellow believers." Awarding the album four and a half stars for 365 Days of Inspiring Media, Emily Kjonaas writes, "With lyrics that continually point Heavenward, and melodies that are soothing to one’s spirit, it’s no wonder why they are well-liked." Laura Chambers, rating the album a 3.8 out of five for Christian Music Review, says, "Cathedrals gently nudges us towards the light with convicting words and grand promises that to our cynical hearts seem too good to be true." Awarding the album ten stars at Jesus Wired, Maddy Agers writes, "it’s a literal masterpiece."

Track listing

Charts

References

2014 albums
Tenth Avenue North albums
Reunion Records albums